Henoc John Mukendi (20 November 1993) is a Congolese footballer who plays as a striker.

Club career

Liverpool
Mukendi joined Liverpool's youth teams in 2007 and made his debut for the Under 18's in the 2010-11 season, going on to make nine appearances and score two goals. He also made his debut for the reserves on 30 March 2011 as a second-half substitute in a Lancashire Senior Cup match against Preston North End.  The following season, he played regularly again for the Under 18s and reserves and in May 2012 he signed a two-year professional contract with Liverpool.

Northampton Town (loan)
In early August 2012, he joined Northampton Town  on loan until January 2013. He made his club debut on 14 August in a League Cup match against Cardiff  and his Football League on 18 August against Rochdale. His first senior goal came on 9 October as the club beat Colchester in a Football League Trophy match. On 3 January 2013, his loan spell with Northampton ended and he returned to his parent club Liverpool.

Partick Thistle (loan)
On 19 July 2013, he joined Scottish top flight club Partick Thistle on loan until 1 January 2014. He made only one competitive appearance for the SPFL side which was on 6 August 2013, during a 2-1 victory over Ayr United in the Scottish League Cup. After six-month at the club, he returned to Liverpool.

Mukendi suggested on his Twitter account that he had been released by Liverpool.

Ashton United
He then moved into non-league football, signing for Ashton United, before moving to Marine.

Stalybridge Celtic
In July 2016 he moved to Stalybridge Celtic.

Northwich Victoria and Colne (loans)
In September 2016 he joined Northwich Victoria on loan. On 3 October 2016, Mukendi joined Colne.

Atherton Collieries
In January 2017 he joined Atherton Collieries.

Sutton Coldfield Town
Only 2 months later, he joined Sutton Coldfield Town.<ref</ref>

Atherton Collieries (second spell)
In August 2017 he again played for Atherton Collieries

Mossley
He then joined Mossley in September 2017. He made his debut for the club on 5 September in an FA Cup match against 1874 Northwich.

Radcliffe
In January 2018 he joined Radcliffe.

Shelley
At the beginning of the 2018-19 season he was playing for Shelley.

International career
In 2011 Mukendi was a member of an under-18 Congolese team who played a friendly match in England.

Personal life
His older brother, Vinny is also a footballer. He also has two sisters and two younger brothers

Career statistics
Up to date, as of 24 July 2013.

References

External links 

1993 births
Living people
Democratic Republic of the Congo footballers
Association football forwards
Liverpool F.C. players
Partick Thistle F.C. players
Northampton Town F.C. players
English Football League players
Marine F.C. players
Ashton United F.C. players
Stalybridge Celtic F.C. players
Northwich Victoria F.C. players
Democratic Republic of the Congo youth international footballers
Atherton Collieries A.F.C. players
Sutton Coldfield Town F.C. players
Colne F.C. players
Mossley A.F.C. players
Radcliffe F.C. players